The Lentulidae are a family of flightless grasshoppers found in sub-Saharan Africa.

Subfamilies and Genera 
The Orthoptera Species File includes:

Lentulinae 
Auth. Dirsh, 1956

Altiusambilla Jago, 1981
Bacteracris Dirsh, 1956
Basutacris Dirsh, 1953
Betiscoides Sjöstedt, 1923
Chromousambilla Jago, 1981
Devylderia Sjöstedt, 1923
Eremidium Karsch, 1896
Gymnidium Karsch, 1896
Helwigacris Rehn, 1944
Karruia Rehn, 1945
Lentula Stål, 1878
Limpopoacris Brown, 2011
Malawia Dirsh, 1968
Mecostiboides Dirsh, 1957
Mecostibus Karsch, 1896
Microusambilla Jago, 1981
Nyassacris Ramme, 1929
Paralentula Rehn, 1944
Qachasia Dirsh, 1956
Rhainopomma Jago, 1981
Swaziacris Dirsh, 1953
Usambilla Sjöstedt, 1910

Shelforditinae 
Auth. Ritchie, 1982
Afrotettix Brown, 1970
Atopotettix Brown, 1970
Calviniacris Dirsh, 1956
Dirshidium Brown, 1970
Kalaharicus Brown, 1961
Karruacris Dirsh, 1958
Leatettix Dirsh, 1956
Occidentula Brown, 1967
Shelfordites Karny, 1910
Uvarovidium Dirsh, 1956

Subfamily unplaced 
Armstrongium Brown, 2014
Tanquata Otte, 2014
Tsautettix Otte, 2014
Zulutettix Otte & Armstrong, 2017

Gallery

References

 
Orthoptera families
Orthoptera of Africa